The Greenough Family Massacre was the axe murders of Karen MacKenzie (31) and her three children, Daniel (16), Amara (7), and Katrina (5), at their remote rural property in Greenough, Western Australia, on 21 February 1993. They were killed by farm hand William Patrick "Bill" Mitchell, an acquaintance of MacKenzie. The crime has been called "one of the worst crimes in Western Australia" and details of the murders were withheld from the public as they were deemed too gruesome and horrific. The case was so heinous that "cries for the return of the death penalty could be heard echoing around the State".

Crime
On the day of the crime, Mitchell had been spending the day getting high on a mixture of cannabis, alcohol, and amphetamines. The trouble began with the sound of a car arriving at the MacKenzie home. Daniel went out to see who it was and was confronted by Mitchell. Mitchell, wielding an axe, killed Daniel and headed for the house, where he found MacKenzie asleep in the lounge room. After attacking her with the axe and killing her, he then raped her. Amara and Katrina were asleep in their bedrooms when Mitchell turned his attention to them.

Investigation and trial
Police and forensic investigators scoured the murder scene and collected evidence. In the meantime, the funeral for the four victims was held on 5 March 1993, attended by Mitchell. It was five weeks before Mitchell, an acquaintance of MacKenzie, was arrested on either 28 or 29 March.

Mitchell pleaded guilty to four counts of wilful murder and four counts of sexual assault. A hand lotion used by the killer was a key piece of evidence. Mitchell was convicted of the murders in 1995 at the age of 24 and was sentenced to four concurrent terms of life imprisonment, with a non-parole period of 20 years. According to the television series Crime Investigation Australia, a judge ruled that the exact way in which Daniel, Amara, and Katrina were killed was to be sealed.

Mitchell is currently incarcerated in Bunbury Regional Prison in Western Australia. Due to a public outcry against the sentence, a Crown appeal ordered the non-parole period to be revoked. There followed a series of Supreme and High Court appeals, including a ruling that Mitchell would never be released. An appeal overturned the non-release ruling and reinstated his 20-year non-parole period, and he consequently became eligible for parole in 2013, with a three-year review in 2016. In September 2013, Mitchell was refused parole. Attorney General Michael Mischin stated that his decision to refuse parole was based upon the gravity of the crime and the safety of the community. He became eligible for parole again in October 2016, and was refused parole again. As required by statute, his next review by the board was due in September 2019. In 2018 due to new McGowan government law which delays parole consideration for mass murderers and serial killers for a period of 6 years, Mitchell was no longer eligible for parole in 2019.

References

Mass murder in 1993
1993 crimes in Australia
February 1993 events in Australia
February 1993 crimes
Massacres in 1993
Axe murder
People murdered in Western Australia
1993 murders in Australia